Ronald "Bo" Rogers (born July 12, 1978 in Chicago, Illinois) is a former Canadian Football League cornerback, last active in 2005 for the Ottawa Renegades. He previously played in the Arena Football League, NFL Europe, and the practice squad of the New York Giants. Rogers became a free agent after going undrafted in the 2006 Dispersal Draft following the suspension of the Renegades' franchise.

College years
Rogers attended Western Michigan University. He finished his career with 14 interceptions, 214 tackles, 39 pass deflections, a sack, two forced fumbles, and two fumble recoveries, and as a senior, he was an All-America pick and an All-Mid-American Conference selection.

References

1978 births
American football cornerbacks
Living people
Ottawa Renegades players
Scottish Claymores players
Western Michigan Broncos football players
Canadian football defensive backs
American players of Canadian football